Sardar Muhammad Arif Nakai was a Punjabi politician from Pakistan and a former Chief Minister of Punjab.

Biography

He was born to a noble Jat family of the Nakai Misl, one of the twelve Misls of Sikh Confederacy. His great-grandfather Sardar Ishar Singh Nakai was born a Sikh and converted to Islam in 1879. Sardar Ishar Singh was the youngest son of Sardar Kahan Singh Nakai, ruler of the Nakai Misl.

He was elected a Member of the Provincial Assembly of the Punjab for four consecutive terms from 1985 to 1988, 1988 to 1990, 1990 to 1993 and 1993 to 1996; and also functioned as Minister for Revenue, Minister for Forests, Minister for Livestock & Dairy Development Department, Minister for Industries and Mineral Development and as Chief Minister of Punjab during 1995–1996. He was father of three sons and a daughter. All three sons, Sardar Pervaiz Hasan Nakai, Sardar Muhammad Asif Nakai and Sardar Atif Nakai became politicians.

He died in Lahore on 29 February 2000, and is buried in his home village of Wan Adhen.

References

1930 births
2000 deaths
Chief Ministers of Punjab, Pakistan
Punjabi people
People from Kasur District